Claude Dausque (1566–1644) was a French Jesuit.

1566 births
1644 deaths
16th-century French Jesuits
17th-century French Jesuits
Place of birth missing